Henry Scowcroft Bettenson (1908, Bolton, Lancashire – 1979) was an English Classical scholar, translator and author. Educated at Bristol University and Oriel College, Oxford; after some years in parish work, he taught Classics for 25 years at Charterhouse, then afterward rector of Purleigh in Essex. Notable works include a translation of Augustine's City of God and Livy's Rome and the Mediterranean. His collection of Early Christian documents, written from an Anglican perspective (hence the emphasis on early councils and on seventeenth century Church of England documents), and history of the Latin fathers remain in print.

Bibliography

Documents of the Christian Church, O.U.P. World Classics, 1943; second edition 1963; (expanded), 1970.

References

1908 births
1979 deaths
English classical scholars
Alumni of Oriel College, Oxford
People educated at Westminster School, London
Latin–English translators
Greek–English translators
20th-century Church of England clergy
20th-century translators
20th-century English male writers